'The Mail Order Wife is a 1912 silent film short produced by the Essanay Studios and starring Francis X. Bushman. It was distributed by the General Film Company.

Cast
Francis X. Bushman - Bob Strong
Bryant Washburn - John White

See also
Francis X. Bushman filmography

References

External links
 The Mail Order Wife at IMDb.com

1912 films
American silent short films
1912 short films
Essanay Studios films
American black-and-white films
1910s American films